Manitoba Economic Development, Investment and Trade (EDIT; ; formerly Economic Development and Jobs) is the provincial government department responsible for economic growth and the creation of jobs in Manitoba.

The department was created in late 2019 out of the former Department of Growth, Enterprise and Trade. The portfolio is overseen by the Minister of Economic Development, Investment and Trade, who is currently Jeff Wharton.

History 
The Department of Competitiveness, Training and Trade was established in 2006, combining responsibilities from the portfolios of Industry, Economic Development and Mines, Intergovernmental Affairs and Trade, and Advanced Education and Training. At the time, Premier Gary Doer announced that the ministry was the first of its kind in Canada, noting that it combined taxation concerns with long-term strategies for education and training.

The department was renamed to Entrepreneurship, Training and Trade in 2009, and to Jobs and the Economy in October 2013.

In 2016, the Department of Growth, Enterprise and Trade (GET) was created when the Jobs and the Economy portfolio combined with that of the Ministry of Mineral Resources, as well as taking on the transportation responsibilities of the former Ministry of Infrastructure and Transportation, and the northern economic development responsibilities of the Ministry of Aboriginal and Northern Affairs.

On 23 October 2019, the Department of Growth, Enterprise and Trade became the Department of Economic Development and Training. As result, GET's resource development division merged with the agriculture ministry to form the new Ministry of Agriculture and Resource Development; the labour and regulatory services division was transferred to Manitoba Finance; and the Office of the Fire Commissioner was transferred to Manitoba Municipal Relations.

In January 2021, the portfolio was renamed to the Department of Economic Development and Jobs. The department was renamed again the following year, on January 18, to Economic Development, Investment and Trade (EDIT).

Ministers

See also

 Manitoba Advanced Education, Skills and Immigration

References

Economic_Development_and_Jobs
Economic_Development_and_Jobs
Economic_Development_and_Jobs
Manitoba
Manitoba